An Electrifying Evening with the Dizzy Gillespie Quintet is a 1961 live album by trumpeter Dizzy Gillespie, recorded at the Museum of Modern Art in New York City.

Track listing
 "Kush" (Dizzy Gillespie) – 11:01
 "Salt Peanuts" (Kenny Clarke, Gillespie) – 7:08
 "A Night in Tunisia" (Gillespie, Frank Paparelli) – 6:46
 "The Mooche" (Duke Ellington, Irving Mills) – 11:43
 Interview with Dizzy Gillespie by Charles Shwartz – 18:03

Personnel
 Dizzy Gillespie - trumpet
 Lalo Schifrin - piano
 Chuck Lampkin - drums
 Bob Cunningham - double bass
 Leo Wright - alto saxophone, flute
 Candido Camero - conga

References 

Dizzy Gillespie live albums
1961 live albums
Verve Records live albums
Albums recorded at the Museum of Modern Art